The 2006 Chicago Cubs season was the 135th season of the Chicago Cubs franchise, the 131st in the National League and the 91st at Wrigley Field. The Cubs finished with a record of 66–96 in last place of the National League Central Division. Chicago was managed by Dusty Baker.

Offseason
 December 7, 2005: Juan Pierre was traded by the Florida Marlins to the Chicago Cubs for Sergio Mitre, Ricky Nolasco, and Renyel Pinto.
 January 10, 2006: Jacque Jones was signed as a free agent with the Chicago Cubs.

Regular season

Season standings

National League Central

Record vs. opponents

Notable transactions
 June 6, 2006: Jeff Samardzija was drafted by the Cubs in the 5th round (149th overall) of the 2006 Major League Baseball draft.

Roster

Game log

|- style="background-color:#bbffbb"
| 1 || April 3 || @ Reds || 16–7 || Ohman (1–0) || Harang (0–1)|| || 42,591 || 1–0
|- style="background-color:#ffbbbb"
| 2 || April 5 || @ Reds || 8–6 || Arroyo (1–0) || Rusch (0–1)|| Weathers (1) || 27,287 || 1–1
|- style="background-color:#bbffbb"
| 3 || April 7 || Cardinals || 5–1 || Maddux (1–0) ||  Suppan (0–1) || || 40,869 || 2–1
|- style="background-color:#bbffbb"
| 4 || April 8 || Cardinals || 3–2 || Howry (1–0) || Thompson (1–1) || Dempster (1)|| 40,182 || 3–1
|- style="background-color:#bbffbb"
| 5 || April 9 || Cardinals || 8–4 || Williamson (1–0) || Isringhausen (0–1)|| || 39,839 || 4–1
|- style="background-color:#ffbbbb"
| 6 || April 11 || Reds || 9–2 || Arroyo (2–0) || Rusch (0–2) || || 36,708 || 4–2
|- style="background-color:#bbffbb"
| 7 || April 12 || Reds || 4–1 || Maddux (2–0) || Claussen (0–1) || Dempster (2) || 37,252 || 5–2
|- style="background-color:#ffbbbb"
| 8 || April 13 || Reds || 8–3 || Milton (2–0) || Zambrano (0–1) || || 40,881 || 5–3
|- style="background-color:#bbffbb"
| 9 || April 14 || @ Pirates || 8–6 || Marshall (1–0) || Santos (1–2) || || 20,233 || 6–3
|- style="background-color:#ffbbbb"
| 10 || April 15 || @ Pirates || 2–1 || Duke (1–1) || Williams (0–1) || Gonzalez (2) || 34,264 || 6–4
|- style="background-color:#bbffbb"
| 11 || April 16 || @ Pirates || 7–3 || Rusch (1–2) || Snell (0–1) || || 15,020 || 7–4
|- style="background-color:#bbffbb"
| 12 || April 17 || @ Dodgers || 4–1 || Maddux (3–0) || Tomko (1–1) || Dempster (3) || 33,511 || 8–4
|- style="background-color:#ffbbbb"
| 13 || April 18 || @ Dodgers || 2–1 || Saito (1–0) || Ohman (1–1) || || 37,342 || 8–5
|- style="background-color:#bbffbb"
| 14 || April 19 || @ Dodgers || 5–4 || Williamson (2–0) || Báez (0–1) || Dempster (4) || 41,288 || 9–5
|- style="background-color:#ffbbbb"
| 15 || April 21 || @ Cardinals || 9–3 || Mulder (2–0) || Williams (0–2) || || 41,379 || 9–6
|- style="background-color:#ffbbbb"
| 16 || April 22 || @ Cardinals || 4–1 || Ponson (2–0) || Rusch (1–3) || Isringhausen (5) || 41,424 || 9–7
|- style="background-color:#bbffbb"
| 17 || April 23 || @ Cardinals || 7–3 || Maddux (4–0) || Marquis (3–1) || || 41,373 || 10–7
|- style="background-color:#bbffbb"
| 18 || April 24 || Marlins || 6–3 || Aardsma (1–0) || Johnson (1–2) || Dempster (5) || 36,865 || 11–7
|- style="background-color:#bbffbb"
| 19 || April 25 || Marlins || 3–1 || Marshall (2–0) || Willis (1–1) || Dempster (6) || 38,680 || 12–7
|- style="background-color:#ffbbbb"
| 20 || April 26 || Marlins || 7–5 || Nolasco (1–0) ||   Williamson (2–1) || Borowski (3) || 39,611 || 12–8
|- style="background-color:#bbffbb"
| 21 || April 28 || Brewers || 6–2 || Maddux (5–0) || Bush (2–2) || || 39,522 || 13–8
|- style="background-color:#ffbbbb"
| 22 || April 29 || Brewers || 16–2 || Davis (1–2) || Rusch (1–4) || || 40,644 || 13–9
|- style="background-color:#ffbbbb"
| 23 || April 30 || Brewers || 9–0 || Capuano (4–2) ||  Zambrano (0–2) || || 39,229 || 13–10

|- style="background-color:#bbffbb"
| 24 || May 1 || Pirates || 2–1 || Howry (2–0) || Grabow (0–1)|| Dempster (7) || 36,602 || 14–10
|- style="background-color:#ffbbbb"
| 25 || May 2 || Pirates || 8–0 || Duke (2–2) || Guzmán (0–1) || || 39,110 || 14–11
|- style="background-color:#ffbbbb"
| 26 || May 3 || @ Diamondbacks || 5–1 || Batista (3–1) || Maddux (5–1)  || Valverde (8) || 25,335 || 14–12
|- style="background-color:#ffbbbb"
| 27 || May 4 || @ Diamondbacks || 6–0 || Cruz (1–0) || Hill (0–1) || || 24,565 || 14–13
|- style="background-color:#ffbbbb"
| 28 || May 5 || @ Padres || 1–0 || Cassidy (2–0) || Williamson (2–2) || || 37,123 || 14–14
|- style="background-color:#ffbbbb"
| 29 || May 6 || @ Padres || 2–1 || Cassidy (3–0) || Howry (2–1) || || 37,745 || 14–15
|- style="background-color:#ffbbbb"
| 30 || May 7 || @ Padres || 6–3 || Williams (3–1) ||  Guzmán (0–2) || Sweeney (1) || 39,847 || 14–16
|- style="background-color:#ffbbbb"
| 31 || May 8 || @ Padres || 8–3 || Young (3–2) || Maddux (5–2) || || 24,139 || 14–17
|- style="background-color:#ffbbbb"
| 32 || May 9 || @ Giants || 6–1 || Schmidt (3–2) || Hill (0–2) || || 39,357 || 14–18
|- style="background-color:#bbffbb"
| 33 || May 10 || @ Giants || 8–1 || Zambrano (1–2) || Cain (1–5) || || 39,655 || 15–18
|- style="background-color:#ffbbbb"
| 34 || May 11 || @ Giants || 9–3 || Wright (3–3) || Marshall (2–1) || || 38,132 || 15–19
|- style="background-color:#ffbbbb"
| 35 || May 12 || Padres || 10–5 || Sweeney (2–0) || Rusch (1–5)  || || 39,245 || 15–20
|- style="background-color:#ffbbbb"
| 36 || May 13 || Padres || 4–3 || Meredith (1–0) || Dempster (0–1) || Hoffman (7) || 40,095 || 15–21
|- style="background-color:#ffbbbb"
| 37 || May 14 || Padres || 9–0 || Hensley (2–2) || Hill (0–3) || || 39,570 || 15–22
|- style="background-color:#bbffbb"
| 38 || May 16 || Nationals || 4–0 || Zambrano (2–2) || Hernández (1–5) || || 39,298 || 16–22
|- style="background-color:#bbffbb"
| 39 || May 17 || Nationals || 5–0 || Marshall (3–1) || Day (2–4) || || 39,757 || 17–22
|- style="background-color:#ffbbbb"
| 40 || May 18 || Nationals || 5–3 || Ortiz (1–4) ||  Wood (0–1) || Cordero (4) || 40,517 || 17–23
|- style="background-color:#ffbbbb"
| 41 || May 19 || @ White Sox || 6–1 || Buehrle (5–2) || Maddux (5–3) || || 39,301 || 17–24
|- style="background-color:#ffbbbb"
| 42 || May 20 || @ White Sox || 7–0 || García (7–1) || Hill (0–4) || || 39,387 || 17–25
|- style="background-color:#bbffbb"
| 43 || May 21 || @ White Sox || 7–4 || Zambrano (3–2) || Cotts (0–2) || Dempster (8) || 38,645 || 18–25
|- style="background-color:#ffbbbb"
| 44 || May 22 || @ Marlins || 9–1 || Nolasco (3–1) || Marshall (3–2) || || 9,462 || 18–26
|- style="background-color:#ffbbbb"
| 45 || May 23 || @ Marlins || 5–4 || Kensing (1–1) || Dempster (0–2) || || 10,979 || 18–27
|- style="background-color:#ffbbbb"
| 46 || May 24 || @ Marlins || 9–3 || Moehler (2–4) || Maddux (5–4) || || 7,720 || 18–28
|- style="background-color:#ffbbbb"
| 47 || May 26 || Braves || 6–5 || Remlinger (2–2) || Dempster (0–3) || Ray (1) || 40,865 || 18–29
|- style="background-color:#ffbbbb"
| 48 || May 27 || Braves || 2–1 || Ramírez (1–0) || Marshall (3–3) || Remlinger (2) || 41,526 || 18–30
|- style="background-color:#ffbbbb"
| 49 || May 28 || Braves || 13–12 || Villarreal (7–0) || Eyre (0–1) || Ray (2) || 41,698 || 18–31
|- style="background-color:#bbffbb"
| 50 || May 29 || Reds || 7–3 || Wood (1–1) || Ramirez (2–4) || Dempster (9) || 40,072 || 19–31
|- style="background-color:#bbffbb"
| 51 || May 30 || Reds || 8–3 || Maddux (6–4) || Claussen (3–6) || || 39,000 || 20–31
|- style="background-color:#ffbbbb"
| 52 || May 31 || Reds || 3–2 || Milton (3–2) || Zambrano (3–3) || Coffey (2) || 39,810 || 20–32

|- style="background-color:#bbffbb"
| 53 || June 2 || @ Cardinals || 5–4 || Dempster (1–3) || Hancock (1–2) || || 45,799 || 21–32
|- style="background-color:#bbffbb"
| 54 || June 3 || @ Cardinals || 8–5 || Rusch (2–5) || Mulder (5–4) || Howry (1) || 45,820 || 22–32
|- style="background-color:#ffbbbb"
| 55 || June 4 || @ Cardinals || 9–6 || Marquis (8–4) || Maddux (6–5) || Isringhausen (18) || 45,753 || 22–33
|- style="background-color:#bbffbb"
| 56 || June 5 || @ Astros || 8–0 || Zambrano (4–3) || Buchholz (3–5) || || 32,814 || 23–33
|- style="background-color:#ffbbbb"
| 57 || June 6 || @ Astros || 4–1 || Rodríguez (7–3) || Wood (1–2) || || 35,903 || 23–34
|- style="background-color:#ffbbbb"
| 58 || June 7 || @ Astros || 1–0 || Sampson (1–0) || Marshall (3–4) || Lidge (15) || 42,492 || 23–35
|- style="background-color:#ffbbbb"
| 59 || June 8 || @ Reds || 7–1 || Arroyo (8–2) || Rusch (2–6) || || 26,059 || 23–36
|- style="background-color:#bbffbb"
| 60 || June 9 || @ Reds || 6–5 || Maddux (7–5) || Ramirez (2–5) || Dempster (10) || 41,064 || 24–36
|- style="background-color:#bbffbb"
| 61 || June 10 || @ Reds || 4–2 || Zambrano (5–3) || Claussen (3–7) || Dempster (11) || 34,141 || 25–36
|- style="background-color:#bbffbb"
| 62 || June 11 || @ Reds || 9–3 || Mármol (1–0) || Milton (4–3) || || 27,250 || 26–36
|- style="background-color:#ffbbbb"
| 63 || June 13 || Astros || 9–2 || Pettitte (6–7) || Marshall (3–5) || || 40,563 || 26–37
|- style="background-color:#ffbbbb"
| 64 || June 14 || Astros || 5–4 || Oswalt (6–3)|| Maddux (7–6) || Lidge (17) || 39,946 || 26–38
|- style="background-color:#ffbbbb"
| 65 || June 15 || Astros || 3–2 || Borkowski (1–0) || Howry (2–2) || Lidge (18) || 40,236 || 26–39
|- style="background-color:#ffbbbb"
| 66 || June 16 || Tigers || 5–3 || Robertson (7–3) || Rusch (2–7) || Jones (18) || 40,683 ||26–40
|- style="background-color:#ffbbbb"
| 67 || June 17 || Tigers || 9–3 || Verlander (8–4) || Mármol (1–1) || || 41,459 || 26–41
|- style="background-color:#ffbbbb"
| 68 || June 18 || Tigers || 12–3 || Rogers (10–3) || Prior (0–1) || || 39,938 || 26–42
|- style="background-color:#bbffbb"
| 69 || June 19 || @ Indians || 12–8 || Marshall (4–5) || Johnson (3–8) || || 26,769 || 27–42
|- style="background-color:#ffbbbb"
| 70 || June 20 || @ Indians || 4–2 || Lee (6–5) || Maddux (7–7) || Wickman (10) || 25,049 || 27–43
|- style="background-color:#bbffbb"
| 71 || June 21 || @ Indians || 9–2 || Zambrano (6–3) || Sabathia (5–4) || || 27,182 || 28–43
|- style="background-color:#ffbbbb"
| 72 || June 23 || @ Twins || 7–2 || Santana (8–4)|| Mármol (1–2) || || 34,361 || 28–44
|- style="background-color:#ffbbbb"
| 73 || June 24 || @ Twins || 3–0 || Bonser (2–1) || Prior (0–2) || Nathan (12) || 42,304 || 28–45
|- style="background-color:#ffbbbb"
| 74 || June 25 || @ Twins || 8–1 || Radke (6–7) || Marshall (4–6) || || 35,128 || 28–46
|- style="background-color:#ffbbbb"
| 75 || June 26 || Brewers || 6–0 || Capuano (9–4) || Maddux (7–8) || || 39,698 || 28–47
|- style="background-color:#ffbbbb"
| 76 || June 27 || Brewers || 8–5 || Shouse (1–0) || Dempster (1–4) || Turnbow (22) || 39,399 || 28–48
|- style="background-color:#bbffbb"
| 77 || June 28 || Brewers || 6–3 || Howry (3–2) || Kolb (2–2) || Dempster (12) || 39,321 || 29–48
|- style="background-color:#ffbbbb"
| 78 || June 29 || Brewers || 5–4 || González (1–0) || Prior (0–3) || Turnbow (23) || 39,144 || 29–49
|- style="background-color:#ffbbbb"
| 79 || June 30 || White Sox || 6–2 || Garland (7–3) || Marshall (4–7) || || 40,720 || 29–50

|- style="background-color:#ffbbbb"
| 80 || July 1 || White Sox || 8–6 || Cotts (1–2) || Dempster (1–5) || Jenks (25) || 41,027 || 29–51
|- style="background-color:#bbffbb"
| 81 || July 2 || White Sox || 15–11 || Zambrano (7–3) || Buehrle (9–5) || Howry (2) || 40,919 || 30–51
|- style="background-color:#ffbbbb"
| 82 || July 3 || @ Astros || 7–2 || Clemens (1–2) || Mármol (1–3) || || 41,655 || 30–52
|- style="background-color:#ffbbbb"
| 83 || July 4 || @ Astros || 7–2 || Pettitte (7–9) || Prior (0–4) || || 41,502 || 30–53
|- style="background-color:#bbffbb"
| 84 || July 5 || @ Astros || 1–0 || Marshall (5–7) || Oswalt (6–5) || Dempster (13) || 31,952 || 31–53
|- style="background-color:#ffbbbb"
| 85 || July 6 || @ Brewers || 2–0 || Capuano (10–4) || Maddux (7–9) || || 37,326 || 31–54
|- style="background-color:#bbffbb"
| 86 || July 7 || @ Brewers || 7–2 || Zambrano (8–3) || Jackson (1–2) || || 41,172 || 32–54
|- style="background-color:#bbffbb"
| 87 || July 8 || @ Brewers || 3–1 || Mármol (2–3) || Bush (5–7) || Dempster (14) || 42,268 || 33–54
|- style="background-color:#bbffbb"
| 88 || July 9 || @ Brewers || 11–4 || Rusch (3–7) || Davis (5–6) || || 41,528 || 34–54
|- style="background-color:#ffbbbb"
| 89 || July 14 || Mets || 6–3 || Trachsel (9–4) || Maddux (7–10) || || 40,782 || 34–55
|- style="background-color:#bbffbb"
| 90 || July 15 || Mets || 9–2 || Zambrano (9–3) || Glavine (11–3) || || 41,368 || 35–55
|- style="background-color:#ffbbbb"
| 91 || July 16 || Mets || 13–7 || Feliciano (3–2) || Marshall (5–8) || || 40,157 || 35–56
|- style="background-color:#bbffbb"
| 92 || July 18 || Astros || 4–2 || Mármol (3–3) || Oswalt (6–7) || Dempster (15) || 39,883 || 36–56
|- style="background-color:#ffbbbb"
| 93 || July 19 || Astros || 4–2 || Clemens (2–3) || Maddux (7–11) || Lidge (22) || 40,344 || 36–57
|- style="background-color:#bbffbb"
| 94 || July 20 || Astros || 4–1 || Zambrano (10–3) || Pettitte (8–10) || Dempster (16) || 40,208 || 37–57
|- style="background-color:#ffbbbb"
| 95 || July 21 || @ Nationals || 7–6 || Rauch (3–1) || Howry (3–3) || Cordero (15) || 35,442 || 37–58
|- style="background-color:#ffbbbb"
| 96 || July 22 || @ Nationals || 7–3 || Hernández (7–8) || Williamson (2–3) || || 38,021 || 37–59
|- style="background-color:#ffbbbb"
| 97 || July 23 || @ Nationals || 7–1 || Armas (7–5) || Mármol (3–4) || || 30,851 || 37–60
|- style="background-color:#bbffbb"
| 98 || July 24 || @ Mets || 8–7 || Maddux (8–11) || Trachsel (9–5) || Dempster (17) || 45,631 || 38–60
|- style="background-color:#bbffbb"
| 99 || July 25 || @ Mets || 8–6 || Zambrano (11–3) || Glavine (11–4) || Howry (3) || 47,686 || 39–60
|- style="background-color:#ffbbbb"
| 100 || July 26 || @ Mets || 1–0 || Heilman (1–3) || Rusch (3–8) || || 40,299 || 39–61
|- style="background-color:#bbffbb"
| 101 || July 27 || Cardinals || 5–4 || Novoa (1–0) || Johnson (0–2) || Dempster (18) || 40,346 || 40–61
|- style="background-color:#bbffbb"
| 102 || July 28 || Cardinals || 6–5 || Mármol (4–4) || Marquis (12–8) || Dempster (19) || 40,420 || 41–61
|- style="background-color:#bbffbb"
| 103 || July 29 || Cardinals || 4–2 || Maddux (9–11) || Reyes (2–5) || Dempster (20) || 41,302 || 42–61
|- style="background-color:#bbffbb"
| 104 || July 30 || Cardinals || 6–3 || Zambrano (12–3) || Carpenter (10–5) || || 40,033 || 43–61
|- style="background-color:#ffbbbb"
| 105 || July 31 || Diamondbacks || 15–4 || Webb (12–4) || Prior (0–5) || || 39,226 || 43–62

|- style="background-color:#bbffbb"
| 106 || August 1 || Diamondbacks || 9–3 || Hill (1–4) || Vargas (8–8) || || 38,970 || 44–62
|- style="background-color:#bbbbbb"
| --- || August 2 || Diamondbacks || colspan=5|Postponed (rain)  || 44–62
|- style="background-color:#ffbbbb"
| 107 || August 3 || Diamondbacks || 10–2 || Cruz (4–6) || Mármol (4–5) || || || 44–63
|- style="background-color:#bbffbb"
| 108 || August 3 || Diamondbacks || 7–3 || Mateo (1–0) || González (3–3) || || 40,715 || 45–63
|- style="background-color:#ffbbbb"
| 109 || August 4 || Pirates || 6–0 || Gorzelanny (2–2) || Zambrano (12–4) || || 39,973 || 45–64
|- style="background-color:#bbffbb"
| 110 || August 5 || Pirates || 7–5 || Prior (1–5) || Duke (7–10) || Dempster (21) || 41,007 || 46–64
|- style="background-color:#bbffbb"
| 111 || August 6 || Pirates || 6–1 || Hill (2–4) || Snell (9–8) || || 40,320 || 47–64
|- style="background-color:#bbffbb"
| 112 || August 8 || @ Brewers || 6–3 || Mármol (5–5) || Ohka (3–3) || Dempster (22) || 36,200 || 48–64
|- style="background-color:#ffbbbb"
| 113 || August 9 || @ Brewers || 6–3 || Bush (8–8) || Zambrano (12–5) || Cordero (4) || 36,012 || 48–65
|- style="background-color:#ffbbbb"
| 114 || August 10 || @ Brewers || 8–6 || Davis (8–6) || Prior (1–6) || Cordero (5) || 41,686 || 48–66
|- style="background-color:#ffbbbb"
| 115 || August 11 || @ Rockies || 10–2 || Cook (8–10) || Hill (2–5) || || 35,744 || 48–67
|- style="background-color:#ffbbbb"
| 116 || August 12 || @ Rockies || 8–4 || Fogg (8–7) || Guzmán (0–3) || || 43,485 || 48–68
|- style="background-color:#bbffbb"
| 117 || August 13 || @ Rockies || 8–7 || Novoa (2–0) || Corpas (0–1) || Dempster (23) || 35,408 || 49–68
|- style="background-color:#bbffbb"
| 118 || August 14 || @ Astros || 3–0 || Zambrano (13–5) || Oswalt (9–8) || Dempster (24) || 37,260 || 50–68
|- style="background-color:#bbffbb"
| 119 || August 15 || @ Astros || 8–6 || Hill (3–5) || Borkowski (1–1) || || 41,531 || 51–68
|- style="background-color:#bbffbb"
| 120 || August 16 || @ Astros || 1–0 || O'Malley (1–0) || Pettitte (11–13) || Howry (4) || 38,989 || 52–68
|- style="background-color:#ffbbbb"
| 121 || August 18 || Cardinals || 11–3 || Marquis (13–11) || Mármol (5–6) || || 40,346 || 52–69
|- style="background-color:#bbffbb"
| 122 || August 19 || Cardinals || 5–4 || Wuertz (1–0)|| Isringhausen (4–6) || || 40,864 || 53–69
|- style="background-color:#ffbbbb"
| 123 || August 20 || Cardinals || 5–3 || Carpenter (12–6) || Mateo (1–1) || Isringhausen (30) || 40,485 || 53–70
|- style="background-color:#ffbbbb"
| 124 || August 21 || Phillies || 6–5 || Lieber (6–9) || Hill (3–6) || Rhodes (3) || 38,950 || 53–71
|- style="background-color:#ffbbbb"
| 125 || August 22 || Phillies || 6–3 || Moyer (1–0) || O'Malley (1–1) || Madson (1) || 38,770 || 53–72
|- style="background-color:#ffbbbb"
| 126 || August 23 || Phillies || 2–1 || Myers (9–6) || Howry (3–4) || Geary (1) || 39,470 || 53–73
|- style="background-color:#bbffbb"
| 127 || August 24 || Phillies || 11–2 || Zambrano (14–5) || Hamels (6–7) || || 39,464 || 54–73
|- style="background-color:#ffbbbb"
| 128 || August 25 || @ Cardinals || 2–0 || Suppan (10–7) || Mateo (1–2) || Isringhausen (31) || 46,004 || 54–74
|- style="background-color:#ffbbbb"
| 129 || August 26 || @ Cardinals || 2–1 || Flores (1–1) || Novoa (2–1) || || 46,036 || 54–75
|- style="background-color:#ffbbbb"
| 130 || August 27 || @ Cardinals || 10–6 || Looper (7–1) || Howry (3–5) || || 44,937 || 54–76
|- style="background-color:#ffbbbb"
| 131 || August 28 || @ Pirates || 11–6 || Snell (12–8) || Guzmán (0–4) || || 12,666 || 54–77
|- style="background-color:#ffbbbb"
| 132 || August 29 || @ Pirates || 7–6 || Capps (5–1) || Dempster (1–6) || || 14,618 || 54–78
|- style="background-color:#ffbbbb"
| 133 || August 30 || @ Pirates || 10–9 || McLeary (1–0) || Dempster (1–7) || || 12,730 || 54–79

|- style="background-color:#bbffbb"
| 134 || September 1 || Giants || 6–2 || Hill (4–6) || Lowry (7–8) || || 38,582 || 55–79
|- style="background-color:#ffbbbb"
| 135 || September 2 || Giants || 4–2 || Cain (11–9) || Marshall (5–9) || Stanton (4) || 40,135 || 55–80
|- style="background-color:#ffbbbb"
| 136 || September 3 || Giants || 7–4 || Schmidt (11–8) || Wuertz (1–1) || Stanton (5) || 40,702 || 55–81
|- style="background-color:#ffbbbb"
| 137 || September 4 || Pirates || 5–4 || Maholm (7–10) || Zambrano (14–6) || Torres (2) || 37,994 || 55–82
|- style="background-color:#ffbbbb"
| 138 || September 5 || Pirates || 6–5 || Grabow (4–1) || Dempster (1–8) || Torres (3) || 31,494 || 55–83
|- style="background-color:#bbffbb"
| 139 || September 6 || Pirates || 7–2 || Wuertz (2–1) || Grabow (4–2) || || 32,557 || 56–83
|- style="background-color:#ffbbbb"
| 140 || September 7 || Pirates || 7–5 || Bayliss (1–0) || Eyre (0–2) || Torres (4) || 27,105 || 56–84
|- style="background-color:#ffbbbb"
| 141 || September 8 || @ Braves || 8–4 || Hudson (12–10) || Guzmán (0–5) || || 30,977 || 56–85
|- style="background-color:#ffbbbb"
| 142 || September 9 || @ Braves || 7–3 || James (9–3) || Miller (0–1) || || 40,584 || 56–86
|- style="background-color:#ffbbbb"
| 143 || September 10 || @ Braves || 2–1 || Cormier (3–4) || Mateo (1–3) || Wickman (13) || 28,212 || 56–87
|- style="background-color:#bbffbb"
| 144 || September 11 || @ Braves || 8–3 || Hill (5–6) || Smoltz (12–9) || || 19,444 || 57–87
|- style="background-color:#bbffbb"
| 145 || September 12 || Dodgers || 9–8 || Aardsma (2–0) || Hamulack (0–3) || || 35,618 || 58–87
|- style="background-color:#ffbbbb"
| 146 || September 13 || Dodgers || 6–0 || Penny (16–8) || Guzmán (0–6) || || 35,868 || 58–88
|- style="background-color:#bbffbb"
| 147 || September 14 || Dodgers || 6–5 || Eyre (1–2) || Tomko (8–7) || Howry (5) || 31,361 || 59–88
|- style="background-color:#ffbbbb"
| 148 || September 15 || Reds || 4–0 || Arroyo (14–9) || Mármol (5–7) || || 37,188 || 59–89
|- style="background-color:#bbffbb"
| 149 || September 16 || Reds || 4–0 || Hill (6–6) || Michalak (1–3) || || 40,526 || 60–89
|- style="background-color:#bbffbb"
| 150 || September 17 || Reds || 11–3 || Zambrano (15–6) || Milton (8–8) || || 39,164 || 61–89
|- style="background-color:#bbffbb"
| 151 || September 18 || @ Phillies || 11–6 || Wuertz (3–1) || Lieber (8–10) || || 31,101 || 62–89
|- style="background-color:#ffbbbb"
| 152 || September 19 || @ Phillies || 4–1 || Moyer (3–2) || Miller (0–2) || Gordon (32) || 31,892 || 62–90
|- style="background-color:#ffbbbb"
| 153 || September 20 || @ Phillies || 6–2 || Myers (12–6) || Walrond (0–1) || || 35,269 || 62–91
|- style="background-color:#ffbbbb"
| 154 || September 22 || @ Reds || 4–2 || Michalak (2–3) || Hill (6–7) || Coffey (8) || 21,332 || 62–92
|- style="background-color:#bbffbb"
| 155 || September 23 || @ Reds || 11–4 || Zambrano (16–6) || Lohse (2–5) || || 28,264 || 63–92
|- style="background-color:#ffbbbb"
| 156 || September 24 || @ Reds || 3–2 || Harang (15–11) || Dempster (1–9) || || 22,226 || 63–93
|- style="background-color:#ffbbbb"
| 157 || September 25 || @ Reds || 5–4 || Schoeneweis (2–0) || Eyre (1–3) || Weathers (12) || 16,278 || 63–94
|- style="background-color:#bbffbb"
| 158 || September 26 || Brewers || 14–6 || Marshall (6–9) || Villanueva (1–2) || || 31,932 || 64–94
|- style="background-color:#bbffbb"
| 159 || September 27 || Brewers || 3–2 || Howry (4–5) || Cordero (3–1) || || 36,273 || 65–94
|- style="background-color:#ffbbbb"
| 160 || September 29 || Rockies || 5–2 || Fogg (11–9) || Zambrano (16–7) || Fuentes (30) || 33,721 || 65–95
|- style="background-color:#ffbbbb"
| 161 || September 30 || Rockies || 11–9 || Ramírez (4–3) || Ryu (0–1) || || 39,483 || 65–96

|- style="background-color:#bbffbb"
| 162 || October 1 || Rockies || 8–5 || Aardsma (3–0) || Affeldt (4–2) || || 39,609 || 66–96

Player stats

Batting

Starters by position
Note: Pos = Position; G = Games played; AB = At bats; H = Hits; Avg.= Batting average; HR = Home runs; RBI = Runs batted in

Other batters
Note: G = Games played; AB = At bats; H = Hits; Avg.= Batting average; HR = Home runs; RBI = Runs batted in

Pitching

Starting pitchers
Note: G = Games pitched; IP = Innings pitched; W = Wins; L = Losses; ERA = Earned run average; S0 = Strikeouts

Other pitchers
Note: G = Games pitched; IP = Innings pitched; W = Wins; L = Losses; ERA = Earned run average; SO = Strikeouts

Relief pitchersNote: G = Games pitched; W = Wins; L = Losses; SV = Saves; ERA = Earned run average; SO = Strikeouts''

Farm system

References

Game Logs:
Chicago Cubs Game Log 1st Half on ESPN.com
Chicago Cubs Game Log 2nd Half on ESPN.com
2006 Batting Statistics on ESPN.com
2006 Pitching Statistics on ESPN.com

External links

2006 Chicago Cubs at Baseball Reference
2006 Chicago Cubs Schedule

Chicago Cubs seasons
Chicago Cubs
Cub